Black Box is a multinational information technology (IT) and consulting services company headquartered in Texas, United States. 

Black Box operates in 75 locations across 35 countries.  In 2022, Black Box had more than 3,800 employees worldwide.

History

Early in 1976
Eugene Yost and Richard Raub established Expandor Inc. in the US in 1976. Six of the eleven items in their inaugural catalogue, known as Black Boxes, were printer switches. Expandor Inc. changed its name to Black Box Corporation in 1982 as it released its well-known "Black Box Catalog. 

Following a temporary dip in operations during Black Monday of 1987, Odyssey Partners bought the company through a leveraged buyout in 1988. In 1989, one of its divisions, “Interlan,” was sold to Racal.

1990s
After suffering losses from debt servicing, Black Box Corporation underwent a restructuring in 1990, moving its lucrative catalogue sales operation from Simi Valley, California, to Lawrence, Pennsylvania. Its telecoms product business was divided into a subsidiary called Micom Communications Corporation. Under the name MB Communications, an initial public offering was registered at NASDAQ in December 1992. The Micom Communications unit was spun off, and acquired by Northern Telecom (Nortel) in June 1996.

In May 1997, Black Box Corporation’s board of directors announced that it authorized management to buy back the company's stock, depending on market prices and other factors. In 1998, the company started offering on-site data and infrastructure services in the United Kingdom, which expanded throughout Europe and Pacific Rim.

The profitable catalog sales business moved from Simi Valley in California to Lawrence, Pennsylvania and changed its name to Black Box Incorporated.

From 2000 to 2010, Black Box Corporation formed partnerships in the USA with key IT service providers, including Cisco, Avaya, NEC, and Unify. There were about 120 acquisitions overall.

In 2019, Black Box Corporation was acquired by AGC Networks. In 2021, AGC Networks changed its name to Black Box.

Rebranding 
In January 2019, AGC Networks Limited acquired Black Box Corporation.

Black Box became a wholly-owned subsidiary of AGC Networks.

In 2021, AGC Networks Limited changed its name to Black Box Limited.

Services and operations 
The business is organized as follows:

 Black Box Global Solutions Integration (GSI) provides Connected Buildings, Digital Workplaces, Customer Experience, Data Centers, and Enterprise Networking Services.
 Black Box Technology Product Solutions (TPS) provides professional Audio Video, Networking, Cabling, and IoT products.
 Black Box Xcelerate Services focuses on Consulting & Design, Project Management, Field Services, and Customer Success and Support Services.

Locations 
Black Box has operations in the following locations:

Asia Pacific China, India, Japan, Malaysia, Philippines, Singapore, South Korea, Taiwan, Bangladesh, and Hong Kong.

America Brazil, Chile, Costa Rica, Colombia, Puerto Rico, Mexico, Canada, and the USA.

Europe Austria, Belgium, Denmark, Finland, France, Germany, Ireland, Italy, Netherlands, Norway, Spain, Sweden, Switzerland, and United Kingdom.

Oceania Australia and New Zealand.

Middle East Saudi Arabia and UAE.

Africa Kenya.

References

Telecommunications companies of the United States
Telecommunications equipment vendors
1975 establishments in Pennsylvania
Telecommunications companies established in 1975
American companies established in 1975
Companies based in Washington County, Pennsylvania
Companies formerly listed on the Nasdaq
1992 initial public offerings
History of telecommunications